Rafael Luis Calvo Muñoz (30 December 1911 – 9 December 1988) was a Spanish film actor. He appeared in more than 60 films including Miracle of Marcelino (1955).

Selected filmography

 Currito of the Cross (1926)
 Doña Juana (1927)
 There Were Thirteen (1931)
 Paloma Fair (1935)
 Bound for Cairo (1935)
 Saint Rogelia (1940)
 The Siege of the Alcazar (1940)
 Arribada forzosa (1944) - Matón de Mariano
 Una mujer en un taxi (1944)
 The Captain's Ship (1947)
 The Holy Queen (1947) - Fernán Ayres
 When the Angels Sleep (1947) - Ventura
 El ángel gris (1947) - Ramón
 The Drummer of Bruch (1948) - Coronel Carotte
 La muralla feliz (1948) - Ladrón
 Campo Bravo (1948)
 Adventures of Juan Lucas (1949)
 Doce horas de vida (1949) - Raúl
 Catalina de Inglaterra (1951) - Enrique VIII
 María Morena (1951) - Cristóbal
 The Pelegrín System (1952) - Bremón (padre)
 Service at Sea (1951)
 The King's Mail (1951)
 Em-Nar, la ciudad de fuego (1952) - Comandante Balboa
 Amaya (1952) - Eudonio
 The Floor Burns (1952)
 Court of Justice (1953)
 Magic Concert (1953)
 Miracle of Marcelino (1955)
 Sucedió en mi aldea (1956) - Colás
 El fenómeno (1956) - Gregorio
 Miguitas y el carbonero (1956)
 Fedra (1956)
 Mensajeros de paz (1957) - Gaspar
 Aquellos tiempos del cuplé (1958) - Julio Olvedo
 Gli zitelloni (1958)
 Die Sklavenkarawane (1958) - Murad Ibrahim
 Patio andalu (1958)
 The Thieves (1959) - Zio di Vincenzo
 Noi siamo due evasi (1959) - Pietrone
 Der Löwe von Babylon (1959) - Säfir
 Alfonso XII and María Cristina (1960)
 Legions of the Nile (1960) - (uncredited)
 Compadece al delincuente (1960)
 Un hecho violento (1960) - Harris
 Ursus (1961) - Mok
 El secreto de los hombres azules (1961) - Don Pedro
 King of Kings (1961) - Simon of Cyrene
 Rosa de Lima (1961) - Adrián
 Historia de un hombre (1961)
 Terrible Sheriff (1962) - Tornado
 La pandilla de los once (1963) - El Coco
 El camino (1963) - El Herrero
 Backfire (1964) - Le Borgne (uncredited)
 El señor de La Salle (1964) - Tabernero
 The Uninhibited (1965) - Pablo
 Two Thousand Dollars for Coyote (1966) - White Feather (uncredited)
 Un hombre solo (1969)
 The Corruption of Chris Miller (1973) - Commissioner (voice, uncredited)
 La tribu de los aurones (1988) - Maestro Jonc (voice) (final film role)

References

Bibliography 
 Mira, Alberto. The Cinema of Spain and Portugal. Wallflower Press, 2005.

External links 
 

1911 births
1988 deaths
Spanish male film actors
Spanish male silent film actors
People from Madrid
20th-century Spanish male actors